Futebol Clube de Penafiel ( or ) is a Portuguese football club founded on 8 February 1951 and based in the city of Penafiel.

Brief history

Penafiel first reached the first division in 1980–81, first lasting two seasons. They also played there from 1983–86, 1987–92 and 2004–06.

In 2007–08, the club played in the second level, and eventually were relegated to the third after finishing second from bottom.

They made the semifinals of the Taça de Portugal in 1985–86, the furthest they've gone in the competition.

In 2013-14, Penafiel finished 3rd in Segunda Liga and reached Primeira Liga for the first time in 8 years, but finished 18th in 2014-15 and were relegated to Segunda Liga again in 2015-16.

League and cup history
{|class="wikitable"
|- style="background:#efefef;"
! Season
!
! Pos.
! Pl.
! W
! D
! L
! GS
! GA
! P
!Cup
!League Cup
!Notes
|-
|1979–80
|2DN
|align=right |1
|align=right|30||align=right|14||align=right|13||align=right|3
|align=right|43||align=right|19||align=right|41
||Round 5
|
|Promoted
|-
|1980–81
|1D
|align=right |10
|align=right|30||align=right|11||align=right|5||align=right|14
|align=right|27||align=right|38||align=right|27
||Round 2
|
|
|-
|1981–82
|1D
|align=right |13
|align=right|30||align=right|9||align=right|5||align=right|16
|align=right|20||align=right|37||align=right|23
||Quarter-final
|
|Relegated
|-
|1982–83
|2DN
|align=right |1
|align=right|–||align=right|–||align=right|–||align=right|–
|align=right|–||align=right|–||align=right|–
||Round 3
|
|Promoted
|-
|1983–84
|1D
|align=right |13
|align=right|30||align=right|7||align=right|7||align=right|16
|align=right|18||align=right|55||align=right|21
||Round 2
|
|
|-
|1984–85
|1D
|align=right |10
|align=right|30||align=right|7||align=right|11||align=right|12
|align=right|25||align=right|42||align=right|25
||Round 4
|
|
|-
|1985–86
|1D
|align=right |15
|align=right|30||align=right|4||align=right|10||align=right|16
|align=right|16||align=right|38||align=right|18
||Semi-final
|
|Relegated
|-
|1986–87
|2DN
|align=right |2
|align=right|30||align=right|12||align=right|13||align=right|5
|align=right|37||align=right|25||align=right|37
||Round 4
|
|Promoted
|-
|1987–88
|1D
|align=right |10
|align=right|38||align=right|10||align=right|18||align=right|10
|align=right|36||align=right|45||align=right|38
||Quarter-final
|
|
|-
|1988–89
|1D
|align=right |15
|align=right|38||align=right|10||align=right|13||align=right|15
|align=right|32||align=right|39||align=right|33
||Round 2
|
|
|-
|1989–90
|1D
|align=right |15
|align=right|34||align=right|9||align=right|8||align=right|17
|align=right|24||align=right|50||align=right|26
||Round 4
|
|
|-
|1990–91
|1D
|align=right |15
|align=right|38||align=right|12||align=right|9||align=right|17
|align=right|34||align=right|51||align=right|33
||Round 5
|
|
|-
|1991–92
|1D
|align=right |17
|align=right|34||align=right|7||align=right|11||align=right|16
|align=right|30||align=right|47||align=right|25
||Quarter-final
|
|Relegated
|-
|1992–93
|2H
|align=right |14
|align=right|34||align=right|12||align=right|6||align=right|16
|align=right|35||align=right|48||align=right|30
||Round 6
|
|
|-
|1993–94
|2H
|align=right |15
|align=right|34||align=right|12||align=right|4||align=right|18
|align=right|30||align=right|45||align=right|28
||Round 3
|
|
|-
|1994–95
|2H
|align=right |10
|align=right|34||align=right|13||align=right|6||align=right|15
|align=right|41||align=right|46||align=right|32
||Round 4
|
|
|-
|1995–96
|2H
|align=right |6
|align=right|34||align=right|15||align=right|7||align=right|12
|align=right|52||align=right|44||align=right|52
||Quarter-final
|
|
|-
|1996–97
|2H
|align=right |5
|align=right|34||align=right|13||align=right|12||align=right|9
|align=right|38||align=right|29||align=right|51
||Round 4
|
|
|-
|1997–98
|2H
|align=right |5
|align=right|34||align=right|17||align=right|8||align=right|9
|align=right|63||align=right|48||align=right|59
||Round 6
|
|
|-
|1998–99
|2H
|align=right |9
|align=right|34||align=right|11||align=right|14||align=right|9
|align=right|56||align=right|49||align=right|47
||Round 5
|
|
|-
|1999–00
|2H
|align=right |6
|align=right|34||align=right|14||align=right|14||align=right|6
|align=right|52||align=right|33||align=right|56
||Round 4
|
|
|-
|2000–01
|2H
|align=right |5
|align=right|34||align=right|17||align=right|7||align=right|10
|align=right|45||align=right|31||align=right|58
||Round 6
|
|
|-
|2001–02
|2H
|align=right |14
|align=right|34||align=right|9||align=right|11||align=right|14
|align=right|27||align=right|38||align=right|38
||Round 5
|
|
|-
|2002–03
|2H
|align=right |14
|align=right|34||align=right|12||align=right|5||align=right|17
|align=right|38||align=right|40||align=right|41
||Round 4
|
|
|-
|2003–04
|2H
|align=right |3
|align=right|34||align=right|20||align=right|7||align=right|7
|align=right|43||align=right|35||align=right|61
||Round 5
|
|Promoted
|-
|2004–05
|1D
|align=right |11
|align=right|34||align=right|13||align=right|4||align=right|17
|align=right|39||align=right|53||align=right|43
||Round 6
|
|
|-
|2005–06
|1D
|align=right |18
|align=right|34||align=right|2||align=right|9||align=right|23
|align=right|21||align=right|61||align=right|15
||Round 4
|
|Relegated
|-
|2006–07
|2H
|align=right |8
|align=right|30||align=right|10||align=right|11||align=right|9
|align=right|23||align=right|27||align=right|41
||Round 4
|
|
|-
|2007–08
|2H
|align=right |15
|align=right|30||align=right|7||align=right|8||align=right|15
|align=right|28||align=right|39||align=right|29
||Round 5
|Group Stage
|Relegated
|-
|2008–09
|2DS
|align=right |1
|align=right|22||align=right|15||align=right|5||align=right|2
|align=right|31||align=right|13||align=right|50
||Round 3
|
|Promoted
|-
|2009–10
|2H
|align=right |7
|align=right|30||align=right|10||align=right|11||align=right|9
|align=right|35||align=right|34||align=right|41
||Round 3
|Round 1
|
|-
|2010–11
|2H
|align=right |12
|align=right|30||align=right|9||align=right|9||align=right|12
|align=right|37||align=right|44||align=right|36
||Round 2
|Second Group Stage
|
|-
|2011–12
|2H
|align=right |8
|align=right|30||align=right|10||align=right|8||align=right|12
|align=right|33||align=right|36||align=right|38
||Round 4
|Second Group Stage
|
|-
|2012–13
|2
|align=right |9
|align=right|42||align=right|16||align=right|12||align=right|14
|align=right|48||align=right|44||align=right|60
||Round 3
|First Group Stage
|
|-
|2013–14
|2
|align=right |3
|align=right|42||align=right|18||align=right|19||align=right|5
|align=right|47||align=right|24||align=right|73
||Quarter-final
|Second Group Stages
|Promoted
|-
|2014–15
|1
|align=right |18
|align=right|34||align=right|5||align=right|7||align=right|22
|align=right|29||align=right|69||align=right|22
|Round 5
|Round 2
|Relegated
|-
|2015–16
|2
|align=right |12
|align=right|46||align=right|13||align=right|22||align=right|11
|align=right|49||align=right|46||align=right|61
|Round 5
|Round 2
|
|-
|2016–17
|2
|align=right |5
|align=right|42||align=right|18||align=right|9||align=right|15
|align=right|56||align=right|55||align=right|63
|Round 5
|Round 2
|
|-
|2017–18
|2
|align=right |5
|align=right|38||align=right|17||align=right|11||align=right|10
|align=right|55||align=right|43||align=right|62
|Round 2
|Round 1
|
|-
|2018–19
|2
|align=right |8
|align=right|34||align=right|13||align=right|6||align=right|15
|align=right|49||align=right|48||align=right|45
|Round 4
|Round 1
|
|-
|2019–20
|2
|align=right |15
|align=right|24||align=right|6||align=right|10||align=right|8
|align=right|23||align=right|24||align=right|28
|Round 3
|Round 3 (Group Stages)
|
|-
|2020-21
|2
|align=right |7
|align=right|34||align=right|12||align=right|10||align=right|12
|align=right|42||align=right|42||align=right|46
|Round 3
|
|
|-
|2021-22
|2
|align=right |7
|align=right|34||align=right|14||align=right|9||align=right|11
|align=right|38||align=right|38||align=right|51
|Round 4
|Round 3 (Group Stages)
|
|}

Last updated: 20 September 2022
Div. = Division; 1D = Portuguese League; 2H = Liga de Honra; 2DS/2DN = Portuguese Second Division
Pos. = Position; Pl = Match played; W = Win; D = Draw; L = Lost; GS = Goal scored; GA = Goal against; P = Points

Honours
 Taça de Honra do Porto: 1981–82

Players

Current squad

Coaching history

  Luís Miguel (1980)
  António Oliveira (1980–1981)
  Carlos Garcia (1981-1982)
  Luís Miguel (1982-1984)
  Manuel Barbosa (1984-1985)
  Fernando Cabrita (1985-1986)
  Luís Miguel (1986-1987)
  José Romão (1987-1989)
  Carlos Alhinho (1989)
  José Augusto (1989-1990)
  Joaquim Teixeira (1990)
  Vítor Manuel (1990-1992)
  Henrique Calisto (1992)
  Carlos Garcia (1992-1993)
  Luís Miguel (1993-1994)
  Henrique Nunes (1994)
  Jorge Regadas (1994-1999)
  Luís Campos (1999-2000)
  Ricardo Formosinho (2000-2001)
  Manuel Correia (2001-2002)
  Professor Neca (2002-2003)
  José Garrido (2003)
  Guto Ferreira (2003-2004)
  Miguel Leal (2004)
  Manuel Fernandes (2004)
  Luís Castro (2004-2006)
  Rui Bento (2006-2007)
  António Sousa (2007-2008)
  Rui Quinta (2008-2009)
  Bruno Cardoso (2009)
  Lázaro Oliveira (2009-2011)
  José Garrido (2011)
  Francisco Chaló (2011-2012)
  Miguel Leal (2012-2014)
  Ricardo Chéu (2014)
  Rui Quinta (2014-2015)
  Carlos Brito (2015)
  Paulo Alves (2015-2017)
  Toni Conceição (2017)
  Armando Evangelista (2017-2019)
  Miguel Leal (2019-2020)
  Pedro Ribeiro (2020-2022)
  Filó (2022-)

References

External links
  

 
Football clubs in Portugal
Association football clubs established in 1951
1951 establishments in Portugal
Primeira Liga clubs
Liga Portugal 2 clubs